James Lewis Venable is an American composer, working primarily in American film and television. He is known for his scores to the animated television series The Powerpuff Girls, Samurai Jack, and Foster's Home for Imaginary Friends. The latter was nominated for an Emmy Award for Outstanding Main Title Theme Music in 2005, the same score won a 2005 Annie Award—Venable's third—for achievement in music for an animated series. Among Venable's feature film scores are Jay and Silent Bob Strike Back, Scary Movie 3, 4, and 5 and EuroTrip. On August 3, 2004, Venable released an electronica album titled Holding Space with Screaming Fan Records.

Filmography

Film

Television

Video games

References

External links
 
 
 

1975 births
Living people
20th-century American composers
21st-century American composers
American film score composers
American male film score composers
American television composers
Musicians from Los Angeles
Kevin Smith
Annie Award winners
Animation composers
Varèse Sarabande Records artists